Characters listed in order of first appearance. Historical figures are indicated by birth and death dates. This list contains spoilers for the source materials.

Book One

Book One, Part I – July 1805 

 Ch. 1 – Anna Pavlovna's party in Petersburg

 Anna Pavlovna Scherer – Wealthy St. Petersburg socialite, age 40. Unmarried hostess of patriotic circle. Also hosts a party in Book Three in which Napoleon's invasion and occupation of Moscow are discussed.
 Prince Vasili Kuragin – A self-seeking man who has a low opinion of his children but seeks to further their interests. Convinces Pierre Bezukhov to marry his daughter Hélène despite Pierre's reservations. Self-serving and manipulative throughout the novel ("...endowed with the rare art of seizing the precise moment when he should and could make use of people"), he consistently attempts to swindle Pierre.
 Elena Vassilievna "Hélène" Kuragina – Beautiful but shallow and self-serving woman, daughter of Prince Vasili. In Book One, she accedes to parental pressure and marries Pierre, becoming Countess Bezukhova. In Book Two, after Pierre wounds Dolokhov in a jealousy-inspired duel, she furiously informs him that rumors of her and Dolokhov having an affair were untrue. In a rage, Pierre threatens to kill her and they separate. Although she is an intellectually limited person, she becomes the toast of Petersburg society by inviting fascinating people to her soirées. In Book Three, she converts to Catholicism so that she may marry a Catholic prince. She continues her success as a society hostess. Upon her death, the official cause is listed as an aneurysm, but society gossip is that she succumbed to a combination of medical ineptitude and suicide. 
 Pierre Bezukhov – Illegitimate son of Count Bezukhov. "Massive, fat," wears glasses, educated abroad but socially inept. A freethinking, sometimes reckless, man capable of decisive action and great displays of willpower when circumstances demand it. In Book One, he inherits his father's enormous fortune and, passively obeying the desires of others, marries the beautiful but shallow Hélène Kuragina. In Book Two, believing the rumors of Hélène having an affair with Dolokhov, he flies into a jealous rage at a celebratory dinner for Prince Bagration and demands satisfaction from Dolokhov; Dolokhov is wounded in the ensuing duel. Later, Pierre is approached by the Freemasons and, thinking that organization has the best chance of establishing a Brotherhood of Man, joins. He becomes disillusioned when he finds that the motivations of some of his brother Masons are not as elevated as his. In Book Three, he plans to assassinate Napoleon, but misses his opportunity. He intervenes in the mistreatment by a French soldier of a young woman and is arrested and accused of being among the incendiarists who torched the city. He is later forced to witness the execution of five Russian civilians. Pierre's fellow prisoners come to respect his knowledge of French and stoicism in captivity. In Book Four????, he and other prisoners are liberated during the Retreat from Moscow by the Denisov/Dolokhov guerilla raid. Now a widower, he falls in love with the now much-matured Natasha Rostova and marries her in the 1st Epilogue. 
 Hippolyte Kuragin (also Prince Ippolit) – Son of Prince Vasili. A diplomat, he is "stupid-looking," has no social graces and is dull and boring, the butt of Bilibin's humor. The best joke he can manage is a pun on "Le Roi de Prusse."
 Vicomte Mortemart (only appearance) – French exile. a "pretty young gentleman with soft features and manners".
 Abbé Morio – Has a plan for world peace; reappears in Book Two at Pierre's Masonic initiation ceremony. Based on the real life priest and writer Scipione Piattoli.
 Prince Andrei Nikolayevich Bolkonsky – Son of the impossibly stern and imposing Prince Nikolay Andreevich Bolkonsky, a former general; married to Lisa (the "little princess"). In Book One, Andrei is deeply resentful of the round of trivialities and useless gossip that fill the life of an idle aristocrat. He advises his friend Pierre to never get married. Welcoming the seriousness of the Napoleonic Wars, he takes to the life of a military officer, and becomes a valued adjutant to Kutuzov. A brave, at times arrogant, soldier, he eagerly seeks glory on the battlefield and goes into combat at Austerlitz alongside Prince Bagration. Lying on the ground wounded, he stares up at the sky and realizes that all talk of glory is foolish; he decides that he is finished with the military life. The French capture him and while recovering he is greeted by Napoleon himself. Believed by his family to have been killed, he arrives at Bald Hills unexpectedly, just in time to witness his wife die giving birth to young prince Nikolay Bolkonsky. In Book Two, he presents a detailed plan for modernizing the army regulations to Arakcheyev, Tsar Alexander's brusque military reformer. Arakcheyev summarily dismisses the plan, but does appoint Bolkonsky to a committee for the topic. While on the committee, Bolkonsky finds that Speransky, the Tsar's liberal advisor for whom he had high hopes, is also just another flawed human being. At a lavish ball, he becomes entranced by the charming and beautiful Natasha Rostova, and pledges that he will marry her. However, she breaks the engagement after her head is turned by the rake Anatole Kuragin, leaving all the Bolkonskys with nothing but contempt for the Rostov family. In Book Three, he turns down Kutusov's request that he serve on the general staff, scorning what he considers pointless service, preferring to command a regiment in combat. At the Battle of Borodino, he is gravely wounded in the side, eventually succumbing. Before his death, he is able to reconcile with Natasha, who alongside his sister Princess Marya nurses him in his final days. 
 Princess Elisabeta "Lisa" Karlovna Bolkonskaya (also Lise and the "little princess") – née Meinena. When her husband Prince Andrei departs for the Napoleonic Wars, he leaves her at his father's remote estate where she is utterly isolated socially. Early in Book Two, she dies in childbirth. 
 Princess Anna Mikhaylovna Drubetskaya – A poor, elderly lady; old friend of Countess Rostova. Relentlessly ambitious for her son Boris, she begs Prince Vassily to get Boris transferred to the Guards, then schemes with Vassily to get the dying Count Bezukhov to leave his vast fortune to his illegitimate son Pierre.

 Ch. 6 – Carousing at Kuragin's with a bear

 Anatole Kuragin – Elder son of Prince Vasili. Handsome, irresponsible and somewhat hedonistic military officer, he is the center of a circle of rowdy young men. "... not resourceful, not quick and eloquent in conversation, but he had a capacity, precious in society, for composure and unalterable assurance ... a manner of contemptuous awareness of his own superiority". In Book Two, Natasha Rostova falls madly in love with him, destroying her engagement to Prince Andrei. Kuragin arranges to elope with her but is thwarted when Sonia reveals the plan. Prince Andrei begins Book Three seeking him in the army in order to challenge him to a duel but is unable to locate him. Following his wounding at Borodino, Andrei is surprised in the medical tent to see Kuragin next to him having one of legs sawn off, whereupon Andrei forgets thoughts of vengeance. 
 Fedor Ivanovich "Fedya" Dolokhov – Infantry officer, rowdy daredevil, valiant in battle, broken to the ranks for scandalous rowdiness, he remains cheerful going into battle. In Book One, he tells ___ that he captured a prisoner and the officer should remember the name Dolokhov. In Book Two, rumored to be having an affair with Hélène Bezukhova, he accepts a demand for satisfaction from her jealous husband Pierre and is nearly killed in the ensuing duel. It then is revealed that, despite his being a noted duelist and drinker, he is most upset that his aging mother's heart will be broken by the incident. He coldly takes a 43,000-ruble bet from Nikolai Rostov at a card game that he knows Rostov cannot afford. In Book xx, He becomes a partisan leader in 1812 (Book .....). Proposed unsuccessfully to Sonya. His prototype was Colonel Aleksandr Figner.[1]
 Stevens (only appearance) – English naval officer. Loses bet with Dolokhov that Dolokhov can’t drain a bottle of rum while teetering on a window ledge.

 Ch. 7 – The Rostov house in Moscow

 Countess Natalya Rostova – "A thin, Oriental type of face, forty-five years old, evidently worn out by children, of whom she had twelve." Natasha's closest confidante, the girl opens her heart to her mother on a nightly basis. 
 Count Ilya Andreich Rostov – The countess's husband. Optimistic father, a big, hearty, jolly man but foolish with money. In Book Two, even though he has told his son Nikolai that he has no more money to give him, he gives in and makes good Nikolai's disastrous 43,000-ruble loss at cards to Dolokhov. As Natasha's wedding to Boris Drubetskoy draws near, the Count worries that he lacks a dowry for his daughter; he has no idea which of his estates and forests are mortgaged or even which ones he still owns. In Book Three, the family must flee Moscow, leaving its property behind to be destroyed as Napoleon's army advances. The distress and upheaval caused by this move and loss leaves the Count no longer his previously cheerful self. In Book Four, he and his wife are overcome with grief upon hearing of the death of their youngest child, Petya, in combat. A broken man, the count dies in the 1st Epilogue, leaving behind so many small debts that the value of his remaining estates only covers half the amount. 
 Vera Rostova – The oldest Rostov daughter. Very beautiful but disliked by everyone, even her mother. In Book Two, she marries the socially ambitious Lieutenant Berg.
 Nikolai Rostov – Age 20, the eldest Rostov son. In Book One, while serving as a junker at Schöngrabern, he falls from his horse and sprains his arm; as he flees the French infantry he thinks, "Why are they running? ... To kill me? Me, whom everybody loves so?". In Book Two, he loses a disastrous bet of 43,000 rubles to the smirking Dolokhov and is greatly relieved when he can return to this regiment and the comradeship of the army. He goes to great lengths to obtain a reprieve from the emperor for a serious charge against his friend Denisov, but Alexander declines, saying he cannot place himself above the law. He returns home on leave to sort out his parents' disastrous financial situation and literally kicks Miten'ka out of the house. In Book xx, his becomes enchanted by Prince Andrei's pious and sincere sister, the shy and homely Princess Marya Bolkonskaya. They later marry.......... In the 1st Epilogue, he leaves the army to attempt to settle his late father's debts as a matter of pride. 
 Natasha Rostova – Age 13; initially, a vivacious and romantic young girl, she evolves through trial and suffering. In Book One, her childhood love of Boris Drubetskoy continues. In Book Two, now age 17, she attends her first ball and dances with Prince Andrei Bolkonsky, resulting in them falling madly in love. He requires a one-year engagement to allow her to decide whether she is truly devoted to him. A few days before the end of this period, she attends an opera at which the rake Anatole Kuragin turns her head. Her emotions in turmoil, Natasha breaks her engagement to Prince Andrei and resolves to elope with Kuragin. Just as Kuragin arrives to carry her off, however, their plan is spoiled by Sonia revealing it to the adults. Natasha is emotionally crushed. In Book Three, she and the rest of her family are stunned to find the wounded Prince Andrei as part of their refugee caravan. She reconciles with him and, along with his sister Princess Marya, nurses him in his final days. In Book Four, she finds a sort of domestic happiness with the formerly avuncular Pierre Bezukhov.
 Petya Rostov – Age 9, the youngest Rostov child. Longs for the glory of military service like his older brother; his parents would prefer he stay safe. In Book Three, he is old enough to enter the army and is killed in the Denisov/Dolokhov guerilla raid; his parents are left disconsolate. 
 Sonya – The 'sterile flower'. Orphaned cousin of Vera, Nikolai, Natasha, and Petya Rostov, in love with Nikolai but at first he has eyes only for Julie Karagina. ............... Book Two reveals the elopement plan of Kuragin and Natasha........... Book Three the one thing she ever wanted, to marry Nikolai, she now gives up because he must marry an heiress )Princess Marya) to make the family whole again. .
 Boris Drubetskoy – Army officer, ambitious son of Princess Anna Mikhaylovna Drubetskaya, childhood friend of Countess Rostova. Annoyed by his mother’s importunings of Prince Vassily on his behalf. Fought at Austerlitz and later married Julie Karagina, thereby becoming rich. 
 Miten'ka – Given name Dmitri Vasileyevich, manager of the Rostovs' accounts; bodily ejected in Book Two by Nikolai who suspects him of embezzlement; the error is explained and Miten'ka taken back by the soft-hearted Count Ilya. 
 Marya Lvovna Karagina (only appearance) – Mother of Julie Karagina, "tall, stout, proud-looking".
 Julie Karagina – Wealthy heiress, "round-faced, smiling". Friend of Marya Bolkonskaya, marries Boris Drubetskoy.

 Ch. 12 – The Bezukhov house in Moscow

 Count Kirill Vladimirovich Bezukhov (only appearance) – Father of Pierre, had served in Catherine II's court. Extremely wealthy, owns 40,000 “souls” (i.e., adult male serfs). Dies after sixth stroke without having uttered a word of dialogue.
Princess Katerina "Katishe" Mamontova – Eldest of Count Bezukhov's three nieces, known as "the three princesses." Furious at the machinations of the grasping Anna Mikhailovna and Prince Vasili to divert her uncle's vast fortune to her cousin Pierre.

 Ch. 15 – Back at the Rostovs's

 Pyotr Nikolaitch Shinshin – Relative of Countess Natalya Rostova, famous for biting wit.
 Lieutenant Alphonse Karlovich Berg – German officer, cares for no talk except about himself. In Book Two, he marries the highly disliked Vera Rostova and invites only people who can help him climb socially to their soirées. 
 Marya Dmitriyevna Akhrosimova – Relative of Count Rostov and matchmaker. Le terrible dragon, large and tall, she has no money or social standing but is invited everywhere because of her indomitable will and her willingness to say anything. In Book Two, she helps negotiate between the Rostovs and the crusty Prince Nikolai when the Prince vigorously objects to the marriage of his son Prince Andrei to the relatively insubstantial Natasha.

 Ch. 22 – Bald Hills, the Bolkonsky estate about 100 miles from Moscow

 Prince Nikolay Andreevitch Bolkonsky – Father of Prince Andrei Nikolayevich Bolkonsky and Princess Marya Bolkonsky, exiled to his remote estate by Tsar Paul (r. 1796-1801); the current tsar quashed the banishment order, but Bolkonsky is perfectly happy to remain at Bald Hills. A general in earlier wars, he is writing his memoirs to support a future history of the campaigns of General Suvorov. A relentlessly domineering man, dismissive of organized religion, he subjects his daughter to exacting standards in her academic work and constant bullying in her personal life; heaping scorn on her for her Christian humility, he eventually threatens to throw her out of the house. In Book Three, he must flee Bald Hills before the approaching French army and goes to his other estate at Bogutcharovo. There he experiences a stroke that paralyzes his right side. As he is dying, he admits to his much-abused daughter that he has always loved and depended on her. 
 Princess Marya Bolkonskaya – A plain woman who struggles between the obligations of her religion and the desires of her heart. Lives in constant fear of her father's ceaseless bullying. Later marries Nikolai Rostov.
 Mademoiselle Amélie Bourienne – Orphaned French companion to Princess Marya Bolkonskaya and her father. Very pretty, she attracts the attention of Anatole Kuragin away from his intended, Princess Marya.
 Tikhon – The elder Prince Bolkonsky's gray-haired butler.
 Mikhail Ivanovich – The elder Prince Bolkonsky's architect. Invited to the dining table by the rigidly hierarchical prince to prove to his daughter that all men are equal, he remains silent throughout the meals.

Book One, Part II – October 1805 

 Ch. 2 – With the Army in the field at Braunau

 General Kutuzov (1745-1813) – An "eagle's beak on his plump face," had lost an eye at the Siege of Izmail. In Book Three, his diligence and modesty eventually save Russia from French invasion, but his slow and deliberate military style lead to wide dissatisfaction among the populace. Resists Alexander I's desire to extend the war beyond Russia's boundaries. 
 Prince Nesvitsky – "A tall staff officer, extremely fat, with a kind, smiling, handsome face and moist eyes."
 Captain Timokhin (only appearance) – Red-nosed captain, valiant in battle, had lost two teeth at the Siege of Izmail. "We all have our weaknesses ... his was a devotion to Bacchus." 
 Zherkov – A cornet of hussars and adjutant to Prince Bagration. A joker, he mocks an Austrian general, raising Andrei Bolkonsky's ire. 
 Prince Kozlovsky – Aide-de-camp to General Kutuzov. 
 General Mack (1752-1828) – Austrian general. Glumly arrives at Kutuzov's headquarters with the news that he surrendered his entire army to Napoleon following the Battle of Ulm.
 Vasily "Vas'ka" Denisov – Captain in the Pavlograd Hussars, roommate of Nikolai Rostov during campaign. Often stays out all night playing cards. Tends to pronounce some, but not all, of his R's like W's (like GR's in the Pevear/Volokhonsky translation). In Book Two, he goes home with Rostov on leave and is smitten by the beautiful, charming young Natasha. Later, his loyalty to the enlisted men threatens his military career when he hijacks some infantry supply wagons for his hungry men. In his defense he angrily accuses some quartermasters of embezzlement, but is .........convicted anyway. His friend Rostov attempts to obtain a reprieve from the emperor, but is refused, with Alexander telling him . In Book Three, he becomes a general of partisan troops during the French retreat from Moscow. In Book xxxx, he proposes unsuccessfully to Natasha Rostova. 
 Lavrushka – Valet to Denisov, later valet to Nikolai Rostov. A rogue. Misled Napoleon.
 Lieutenant Telyanin (only appearance) – Steals Denisov's purse; abjectly gives it back when confronted by Nikolai Rostov, but Rostov contemptuously throws it back to him when he sees how craven Telyanin is. 
 Staff-Captain Kirsten (only appearance) – Tall??********Very honorable and proud of his regiment. "Had twice been broken to the ranks for affairs of honour and had twice won back his commission."

 Ch. 9 – 

 General Schmitt (1743-1805) – Austrian general killed in battle at Krems, where Kutuzov won a victory.

 Ch. 10 – The Allied conclave at Brünn

 Bilibin – Russian diplomat to Austria, "about thirty-five, a bachelor, of the same society as Prince Andrei ... His thin, drawn, yellowish face was all covered with deep wrinkles ... The movements of these wrinkles constituted the main play of his physiognomy."
 Emperor Francis I of Austria (1768-1835) – "A ruddy, long-faced young man..." Meets with Prince Andrei after Andrei brings the news of Kutuzov's close-call victory at Schöngrabern. "The emperor spoke with such an expression as if his whole goal consisted in asking a certain number of questions. The replies to these questions, as was only too clear, were of no interest to him." 
 Franz – Bilibin's servant

 Ch. 13 – With the Army in the field Near Etzelsdorf

 Prince Bagration (1765-1812) – "A firm and immobile face of the Oriental type, dry, not yet an old man." Considered "the hero of heroes" by Tolstoy. Modest and polite but possesses a very strong character, an accurate image of Bagration in real life. Fights the French in a rear-guard action near Schöngrabern in 1805, protecting Kutuzov. Commander of an army in 1812, he is killed at Borodino.
 Captain Tushin – "Large, intelligent, kindly eyes". Commander of a battery of four cannon that valiantly holds the center of the Russian line at Schöngrabern. Loses an arm at Friedland.
 General Wintzingerode (1770-1818) – MENTION ONLY, NOT A CHARACTER German nobleman and officer in several different armies of the Napoleonic Wars.

Book One, Part III – November 1805 

 Ch. 2 – Prince Vasili's house in Petersburg

 Princess Aline Kuragina (only appearance) – Wife of Prince Vasili, "a massive, once-beautiful, imposing woman"
 Count Vyazmitinov (1744-1819) – Governor General of Petersburg

 Ch. 3 – Bald Hills

  Yakov Alpatych – Steward of the Bolkonsky estate. He has the avenue cleared of snow in expectation of the arrival of Prince Vasili and his son Anatole; Old Prince Nikolay swings at him with a walking stick and spitefully orders him to put the snow back. In Book Three, the old prince sends him to Smolensk for provisions where he gets caught in the French bombardment of the town. 

 Ch. 8 – With the Army in the field near Olmütz

 Tsar Alexander I of Russia (1777-1825) – Reviews the combined Russian/Austrian armies at Olmütz, "...with his pleasant face and sonorous but not loud voice, attracted the full force of attention." Liberal emperor early in his reign but gradually became more conservative.
 Prince Dolgorukov (1777-1806) – Hearty Russian general. Prince Andrei seeks his assistance in getting patronage for Nikolai Rostov.
 Prince Czartoryski (1770-1861) – Minister of Foreign Affairs. "...a short man ... with an intelligent face and a distinctive, sharply protruding jaw..." Prince Andrei calls him "one of the most remarkable, and for me most unpleasant, of men."
 General Weyrother (1755-1806) – Austrian general who presents his plan for the attack at Austerlitz to the other Allied generals. Kutuzov dozes through the presentation, Langeron is skeptical. In the event, the battle is a disaster for the Allies and Weyrother retires from military life.
 General Miloradovich (1771-1825) – Russian general at the debacle of Austerlitz
 Count Langeron (1763-1831) – Noble who left France. An Allied commander at Austerlitz, where his troops were decimated.
 General Dokhturov (1756-1816) – One of the characters used as a mouthpiece by Tolstoy to express his disillusionment with the tendency of historians to attribute the course of events to the will of certain iconic, often heroic figures despite the fact that more obscure but perhaps equally influential characters contributed to the eventual outcome. "Short ... with a diligent, modest look." Unheralded but played a decisive role at Austerlitz, Smolensk, Borodino, and Maloyaroslavets.

 Ch. 18 – At the Battle of Austerlitz

 Captain von Toll (1777-1842) – German officer who helps the distraught Tsar Alexander across a ditch at a lonely farmhouse after the rout of the Russian center at Austerlitz; this moment is watched helplessly by Nikolai Rostov who wanted desperately to help his sovereign in some way. Serves as a colonel in 1812.
 Napoléon Bonaparte (1761-1821) – The Great Man, ruined by great blunders. "The whole of his stout, short figure with its broad, fat shoulders and involuntarily thrust-out stomach and chest, had that imposing, stately look which pampered forty-year-old men have." In Book One he tours a group of wounded prisoners and sees Prince Andrei. At the beginning of Book Three he meets with Alexander I's envoy Balashov and storms and blusters but later invites him to dinner. Later, his determination to take Moscow with winter coming on results in catastrophic retreat for his army. 
 Prince Repnin – Squadron commander of Russian army at Austerlitz. Treated as a wounded prisoner alongside Andrei Bolkonsky after the battle, he is greeted courteously by Napoléon.

 Dominique Jean Larrey (1766-1842) – Napoleon's surgeon; he considers Prince Andrei "a nervous, bilious type", and insists that he won't survive his wound.

Book Two

Book Two, Part I 

Ch. 2 – 

 Feoktist – "famous head chef" of the English Club 

Ch. 8 – Princess Lisa dies in childbirth at Bald Hills

 Maria Bogdanovna – midwife attending Princess Lisa Bolkonskaya

Book Two, Part II 

 Ch. 2 – The Freemasons recruit Pierre

 Joseph Alexéevich Bazdéev – A stranger whom Pierre encounters at a carriage horse posting station; "a squat, large-boned, sallow, wrinkled old man with gray, beetling brows over glittering eyes..." Pierre is unsettled upon learning that this stranger seems to know all about his having nearly killed a man in a duel. Bazdéev reveals himself to be a Freemason, and challenges Pierre on the way he has been living his life. Pierre, deeply troubled by his current way of living, is only too ready to listen to Bazdéev's scorn for Pierre's atheism. Bazdées invites Pierre to join the brotherhood of Freemasons and Pierre gladly agrees. 
 Count Willarski – A young Polish nobleman "whom Pierre knew superficially in Petersburg society" who sponsors Pierre in the Fraternity of Freemasons.
 Smolyaninov (only appearance) – The rhetor who presides at Pierre's Masonic initiation.

 Ch. 15 – 

 Count Platov (1753-1818) – In Book Three, commander of the division o which Nicholai Rostov is assigned

Book Two, Part III 

 Ch. 4 – Prince Andrei's project for reforming the Army

 Count Arakcheyev (1769-1834) – severe minister of war in 1809; cruel and cowardly, but trusted by Tsar Alexander I; "...a forty-year-old man with a long waist, a long, close-cropped head, and thick wrinkles, with scowling brows over dull, hazel-green eyes and a drooping red nose"; dismisses Prince Andrei's proposal to reform the military regulations out of hand, but agrees to forward them to the commission; former minister of war by 1812 
  Count Kochubey – holds a soiree the day after Andrei's meeting with Arakcheyev at which he introduces Andrei to Speransky
 Count Speransky (1772-1839) – liberal advisor to Tsar Alexander; "...a tall, balding, fair-haired man of about forty ... Speransky's entire figure was of a special type ... this calm and self-assurance of clumsy and obtuse movements ... such firmness of a totally meaningless smile"; eventually dismissed by Alexander.

 Ch. 13 - 

 Dunyasha – Servant of Countess Rostova

 Ch. 18 – Prince Andrei becomes disillusioned about Speransky

 Bitsky – "a man who served on various committees and frequented all the different cliques of Petersburg ... a passionate admirer of the new ideas and of Speransky ... one of those people who chose a trend as they do their clothes—according to the fashion"; he rushes into Prince Andrei's room to deliver his rapturous account of the Tsar's opening address to the State Council.
 Magnitsky – chairman of the Committee on Army Regulations; Prince Andrei meets him at Speransky's informal dinner gathering where the atmosphere of levity increases Andrei's disillusionment.

Book Two, Part IV 

 Ch. 3 – The Hunt at Otradnoe

 Danilo – The Rostovs's kennelman and huntsman, "a wrinkled old hunter, his gray hair cut round in Ukrainian fashion"
 "Uncle" – Given name Mikhail Nikanorych, avid huntsman and distant relative of the Rostovs who lives near their estate at Otradnoe, "a fresh, handsome old man with big gray mustaches"; during the hunt, he constantly calls out, "That's it, come on!!"
 Semeon Tchekmar – Old Count Rostov's valet, "an old horseman now grown heavy in the saddle"
 Mitka – Old Count Rostov's other groom, "a desperate horseman and passionate hunter"
 Nastasya Ivanovna – Cross-dressing "old buffoon" who lives with the Rostovs at their estate at Otradnoe; Natasha: "What kind of children will I have?" Nastasya Ivanovna: "Why, fleas, crickets, grasshoppers."
 Ilyagin – Neighbor at Otradnoe who sometimes hunts the Rostovs's land, resulting in quarrels and a lawsuit; when he rides up to Nikolai, the young Count finds him courteous and even enthusiastic about the hunt.

 Ch. 9 – 

 Madame Schoss – given name Louisa Ivanovna; associate of the Rostov household

Book Two, Part V 

 Ch. 3 – Old Prince Bolkonsky at his house in Moscow

 Métivier – French doctor fashionable in Moscow in 1811; "a man of immense height, handsome, amiable as Frenchmen are, and ... extraordinarily skillful in his profession;" tossed out by Prince Nikolay in a rage: "French Spy! Bonaparte's slave and spy, out of my house!"
 Count Rostopchin (1763-1826) – Serves as Governor-General of Moscow in Book Three as Napoleon approaches; tries his best to steady the populace. After capturing the city, the French force him to burn his own house. 
 Filipp – footman to Prince Nikolai Bolkonsky; threatened with enrollment in the Army by the Prince in one of his rages
 General Chatrov – an old comrade in arms of Prince Nikolai Bolkonsky, guest at a dinner at the old Prince's Moscow house

 Ch. 16 – Kuragin and Natasha attempt to elope

 Balaga – (only appearance) Dolokhov's and Kuragin's fast, even reckless, troika driver; completely loyal, he plays a crucial role in Kuragin's attempted elopement with Natasha.

Book Three

Book Three, Part I – Spring 1812 

 Ch. 2-7 – Napoleon in Vilna

 Louis Alexandre Berthier (1753-1815) – Napoleon's commander of staff
 Count Bennigsen (1745-1826) – German leader of Russian at Eylau (a draw) and Friedland (a decisive defeat); holds a ball at his estate for Tsar Alexander on the same day Napoleon's army begins crossing the Niemen; a senior commander in 1812.
 General Balashov (1770-1837) – Adjutant-General in attendance upon the Tsar; personally delivers Alexander's ultimatum to Napoleon that the French leave Russian soil.
 Marshal Murat (1767-1815) – Napoleon's brother-in-law, styled "the King of Naples" and because of it carries himself pompously; with Napoleon at Borodino; retreated at Tarutino.
 General Davout (1770-1823) – plays the role for Napoleon that Arakcheev does for Alexander, "equally efficient and cruel"; Balashov finds him in a dark peasant shed because Davout is "one of those people who deliberately set themselves up in the most gloomy conditions of life, so as to have the right to be gloomy."
 Bessieres (1768-1813) –
 Marquis de Caulaincourt (1723-1823) – French ambassador to Russia

 Ch. 9 – The Tsar is presented with conflicting plans from his generals

 Marshal Barclay de Tolly (1761-1818) – Senior commander of Russian forces in 1812 until replaced by Kutuzov; receives Prince Andrei "drily and coldly".
 Prince Volkonsky (1776-1852) – The Imperial Army's quartermaster general in 1812.
 General Pfuel (1757-1826) – German chief organizer of Russian Plan of Campaign in 1812; contemptuous of all other plans, insisting only his can save Russia; after listening to all the proposals and counterproposals, Prince Andrei silently agrees that Pfuel's is the proper one, despite his arrogance.
 General von Wolzogen (1773-1845) – Implementer of Pfuhl's plan in 1812.
 Aleksey Petrovich Yermolov (1777-186o1) – In Bagration's camp in 1812. In Book Three, leads the defense of the Russian right wing, known as Raevsky's Redoubt, as it was being overrun by the French. ........ Later advised retreat from Fili that involved abandoning Moscow to the French.

 Ch. 12 – With the army in camp near the Drissa

 Michaud – A Russian colonel. Brought news of the abandonment of Moscow to Tsar Alexander.
 Ilyin – Sixteen-year-old junior officer in the xxxxxx hussars, taken under his wing by Nikolai Rostov
 Marya Genrikhovna – Pretty, plump, flaxen-haired wife of the regimental doctor; the hussar officers enjoy her good humor and tea-making while her husband is resentful of their attentions. 
 Count Osterman-Tolstoy (1770-1857) – Present at a council near Moscow during the retreat to beyond that city.

 Ch. 14 – Combat
 ostermand-tolstoy

 Ch. 21 – The gathering of the gentry at **Stepanov** Castle

 Stepan Stepanovich Adraksin – Known to Pierre his card-playing circle, he denounces Pierre's suggestion that the gentry ask the Emperor for more information.
 Monsieur Dessalles – A Swiss teacher for Young Prince Nikolay; he discomfits Old Prince Nikolay when he mentions the letter sent by Prince Andrei that points out that the French are much closer to Bald Hills than the old prince thought. 
 General Broussier (1766-1814) – French division commander at Tarutino

Book Three, Part II – Summer 1812 

Ch. 4 – The bombardment of Smolensk

 Therapontov Shopkeeper at Smolensk; he welcomes Alpatych then they must run inside when the French bombardment begins.

Ch. xxx – The peasants of Bogutcharovo rebel

 Dron Zakhárych (Drónushka) – Village elder of Bogutcharovo; has loyally served the Bolkonskys for years, but doesn't feel up to the challenge of the ........... Roughly placed under arrest by Nikolai Rostov who holds him responsible for the rebelliousness of the peasantry. 

Ch. x – The Battle of Borodino

 Carl von Clausewitz (1780-1831) – One of two German staff officers in Russian service, the other being Wolzogen, who ride past Prince Andrei the night of the eve of Battle of Borodino; renowned for his comprehensive theory of military operations, On War (publ. 1832).
 Platon Karataev – Peasant who influences Pierre Bezukhov during his time as a prisoner of war.
 Shapovalov – A Cossack who stumbles upon the left flank of Murat's army on October 2 while pursuing a hare; the inactivity he witnesses serves as the basis of the attack that launches the Battle of Tarutino.
 Count Orlov-Denisov (1775-1843) – Commander of Cossacks who alone reached the assigned position at Tarutino. His forces caused Murat to retreat.
 Pavel Vasilievich Chichagov (1767–1849) or Tchichagov was a Russian military and naval commander of the Napoleonic wars.
 Major-General Grekov – Commanded two regiments of cossacks under Orlov-Denisov at Tarutino. Initially routed French under Marat.
 Vereshchagin – Name of Moscow merchant and his son. The son accused of betraying Moscow to the French and scapegoated by Count Rostopchin, whereupon he is mutilated by a mob.
 Belliard – General in the French army at Borodino, Napoleon calls him impetuous

Ch. 27 – 

 General Compans (1769-1845) – French general who is assigned to attack the fleches at Borodino
 Marshal Ney (1769-1815) – French marshal, fought at Borodino
 General Count Jean Rapp (1771-1821) – Adjutant to Napoleon at Borodino; "Do you think we will succeed, Rapp?" "Undoubtedly, Sire!"

Book Three, Part III – xxxxxx 1812 

Ch. 27

 Makar Alexeyevich Bazdeyev – brother of the above

Ch. 28

 Captain Ramballe – 13th Light Regiment, Chevalier of the Legion of Honor; befriends Pierre during the latter's captivity in Moscow. Weak after Krasnoe.

References

 
Lists of literary characters
Fictional Russian people in literature